Section 126 of the Constitution Act, 1867 is a provision of the Constitution of Canada relating to consolidated revenue funds of the provinces.

The Constitution Act, 1867 is the constitutional statute which established Canada.  Originally named the British North America Act, 1867, the Act continues to be the foundational statute for the Constitution of Canada, although it has been amended many times since 1867.  It is now recognised as part of the supreme law of Canada.

Constitution Act, 1867

The Constitution Act, 1867 is part of the Constitution of Canada and thus part of the supreme law of Canada.  It was the product of extensive negotiations by the governments of the British North American provinces in the 1860s. The Act sets out the constitutional framework of Canada, including the structure of the  federal government and the powers of the federal government and the provinces.  Originally enacted in 1867 by the British Parliament under the name the British North America Act, 1867, in 1982 the Act was brought under full Canadian control through the Patriation of the Constitution, and was renamed the Constitution Act, 1867.  Since Patriation the Act can only be amended in Canada, under the amending formula set out in the Constitution Act, 1982.

Text of section 126 

Section 126 reads:

Section 126 is found in Part VIII of the Constitution Act, 1867, dealing with revenues, debts, assets and taxation.  It has not been amended since the Act was enacted in 1867.

Purpose and interpretation
At Confederation, a large part of provincial assets were transferred to the federal government, in exchange for the federal government assuming the existing provincial debts, and providing federal subsidies to the provinces.  Section 126 provides that each province is to maintain a consolidated revenue fund for all remaining provincial liquid assets, present and future. This approach was based on the financial reforms of the British government in the late 18th century, which created the consolidated fund of the British government.

Related provisions

Section 102 of the Act is the federal equivalent to section 126, setting out the requirement for the federal consolidated revenue fund.

Each of the provinces maintains a consolidated revenue fund (or equivalent name) consistent with this section:

 Alberta:  "general revenue fund"

 British Columbia:  "consolidated revenue fund"

 Manitoba:  "consolidated fund"

 New Brunswick:  "consolidated fund"

 Newfoundland & Labrador:  "consolidated revenue fund"

 Nova Scotia:  "general revenue fund"

 Ontario:  "consolidated revenue fund"

 Prince Edward Island: "operating fund"

 Quebec:  "consolidated revenue fund"

Saskatchewan:  "general revenue fund"

References 

Constitution of Canada
Canadian Confederation
Federalism in Canada